The Education and Adoption Act 2016 (c. 6) is an Act of the Parliament of the United Kingdom giving the government new powers to intervene more rapidly in schools rated by Ofsted as "inadequate" or "coasting" and speed up the process of converting failing comprehensive schools into academies. The bill was presented to the House of Commons on 3 June 2015 by Nicky Morgan the Secretary of State for Education.

The measures in the Act are also designed to speed up the adoption process by the Secretary of State requiring local authorities to make arrangements for their adoption functions (recruitment, assessment and approval) to be carried out by another adoption agency.

The Act makes amendments to the Education Act 2011, Academies Act 2010, Education and Inspections Act 2006.

The bill started in the House of Commons, which passed to the House of Lords, and then received the Royal Assent.

References

External links 
 Education and Adoption Bill - UK Parliament
 Up to 1,000 failing schools to be transformed under new measures - UK Government

United Kingdom Education Acts
United Kingdom Acts of Parliament 2016
Education in England
2016 in education
Reform in the United Kingdom
Education reform